N. V. Natarajan was an Indian politician of the Dravida Munnetra Kazhagam (DMK) and Member of the Legislative Assembly of Tamil Nadu. He was a founding member of the DMK. He served as the Minister of Labour and Backward Classes in the Tamil Nadu government during 1969-75.

Biography
N. V. Natarajan was born on 12 November 1912 in a famous Tuluva Vellala merchant family of Madras. Initially he was a member of Indian National Congress. During 1938-46 he was a member of the Justice Party (later renamed as Dravidar Kazhagam). In 1949, he along with C. N. Annadurai, K. A. Mathiazhagan, E. V. K. Sampath and V. R. Nedunchezhiyan split from the Dravidar Kazhagam and formed the Dravida Munnetra Kazhagam. He was the party's organisational secretary from 1960 until his death. He unsuccessfully contested the 1957 and 1962 assembly elections from the Basin Bridge constituency. In 1964, he was nominated to the Tamil Nadu Legislative Council. He was the minister for Labour and Backward Classes in the  M. Karunanidhi cabinet during 1969-75. He died on 3 August 1975.

Natarajan and his wife, Bhuvaneshwari Natarajan, had seven children. One of his sons, N. V. N. Somu, later became a member of Parliament as a DMK candidate.

References

Dravida Munnetra Kazhagam politicians
1912 births
1975 deaths